Sacramento is a city in the northern Mexican state of Coahuila. 
The city serves as the administrative centre for the surrounding municipality of the same name.

It was founded in 1842 as Villa Nueva. It is believed to have changed its name to Sacramento ("sacrament") to honour a visit by Fr. Miguel Hidalgo during which he officiated a mass.

External links
Sacramento municipal webpage (in Spanish)
Sacramento Enciclopedia de los Municipios de México, INAFED

Populated places in Coahuila
1842 establishments in Mexico